Kah-wai “Buddha” Lo (known professionally as Buddha Lo) is a Chinese-Australian chef, best known for winning the nineteenth season of Top Chef, titled Top Chef: Houston. He then returned to compete in the twentieth season, Top Chef: World All-Stars.

Early life and career 
Lo is currently an executive chef at Huso and cook at Eleven Madison Park in New York City. Lo was the head chef at Matteo’s Restaurant in Melbourne, Victoria, Australia and in 2014 worked at Restaurant Gordon Ramsay in London, United Kingdom. Lo received the Gordon Ramsay Excellence Award while working in London.

Lo has also worked at a restaurant owned by Raymond Capaldi and the Hare and Grace. He was also the chef ambassador for Lavazza and Tabasco and was a former apprentice chef at Matteo’s in Fitzroy, Victoria, Australia. Lo attended William Angliss Institute in Melbourne, Australia, and worked for two months at the two-Michelin-starred Château Cordellian-Bages in Pauillac, France.

References

External links 

Living people
1991 births
Australian chefs
Top Chef winners